Uroš Bundalo (born 29 April 1989) is a professional handball player who plays for German club HC Erlangen. He represented Slovenia at the 2013 World Men's Handball Championship and also at the 2015 World Men's Handball Championship.

References

1989 births
Living people
Handball players from Ljubljana
Slovenian male handball players
Expatriate handball players
Slovenian expatriate sportspeople in France
Slovenian expatriate sportspeople in Germany
Slovenian people of Serbian descent